Bogomazovka is a rural locality (a khutor) in Krasnoyarskoye Rural Settlement, Chernyshkovsky District, Volgograd Oblast, Russia. The population was 202 as of 2010. There are 4 streets.

Geography 
Bogomazovka is located on the left bank of the Tsimla River, 9 km southeast of Chernyshkovsky (the district's administrative centre) by road. Krasnoyarsky is the nearest rural locality.

References 

Rural localities in Chernyshkovsky District